Robert Franklin Bennett was the Anglican Bishop of Huron between 2008 and 2016.

Born in 1949 and educated at the University of Western Ontario, Bennett was ordained in 1974. He held curacies at Chesley and Windsor and incumbencies at Simcoe, Port Ryerse, Kitchener and Brantford, all in Ontario. His last posts before elevation to the episcopate were as Rector of All Saints Church, Windsor, Ontario and Archdeacon of Essex.

References

 

Anglican Church of Canada archdeacons
Anglican bishops of Huron
21st-century Anglican Church of Canada bishops
Living people
1949 births
University of Western Ontario alumni